The Moroccan Debt Administration, formally known as the Contrôle de la dette from 1904 to 1910 and after that as the Administration du Contrôle de la dette publique mahghzénienne (referring to the Moroccan monarchy as the Makhzen), was an entity set up by the French government in 1904 to administer the sovereign debt of the Moroccan Monarchy.

History

The Moroccan Debt Administration originated in 1904, as Morocco's sovereign debt, which had increased significantly following the Hispano-Moroccan War (1859–1860) and the First Melillan campaign of 1894, was restructured by the Banque de Paris et des Pays-Bas (BPPB) in coordination with the French government. as a consequence, France became the only creditor of the Moroccan government. The loan amount was 62,5 million francs, divided in 125.000 bonds of nominal value 500 francs each, for an interest rate of 5 percent. It was guaranteed by revenue from the Moroccan customs, in the collection of which the Debt Administration would be directly involved. A further loan was negotiated in 1910.

An indirect consequence of the 1904 debt restructuring was the establishment of the State Bank of Morocco in 1907, also in Tangier, following the Algeciras Conference of 1906.

The administration acted on behalf of the private debt consortium, under the auspices of the French government but free from hierarchical authority of the French Consul in Tangier. It was initially led by French diplomat , then by Gaston Guiot under whom its expanded into an increasing number of state-like functions, until the Treaty of Fes formally established the French protectorate in Morocco in March 1912. It kept receiving Morocco's customs revenue until 1918, and was still in activity in 1925.

Building

It was built in Moorish Revival architecture by the local firm of Desforges & Rousseau. 

With the establishment of the Tangier International Zone, the building initially hosted the offices of the zone's International Administration, which stayed there until 1937.

As of 2022, the building, also known as Dar el-Salaf and located at 29 boulevard Pasteur, is the seat of the Regional Tourism Authority. It also houses the personal library donated in 1985 to the City of Tangier by  influential scholar Abdellah Guennoun, whose volumes were transferred there after his death in 1989.

See also
 Chinese Maritime Customs Service
 Caisse de la Dette in Egypt
 Ottoman Public Debt Administration 
 International Financial Control in Greece

Notes

Palaces in Morocco
Buildings and structures in Tangier
Spanish North Africa
Moorish Revival architecture